James Blair (4 October 1825 – 25 October 1901) was born in Selkirk, Scotland. His family immigrated to Upper Canada and settled at Windsor Harbour in 1836.

References 

 

1825 births
1901 deaths
Canadian farmers
Scottish emigrants to Canada